Soul Soldier (produced under the working title Men of the Tenth; originally released as The Red, White, and Black; released on home video in the United States as Buffalo Soldier; released on home video in Australia as Black Cavalry; also called Soul Soldiers) is a 1970 American blaxploitation Western film. The film was initially produced by Hirschman-Northern Productions under the working title Men of the Tenth. After it was filmed on 16 mm film and released under the title The Red, White, and Black, producer Stuart Hirschman asked John Cardos to salvage the film, and Cardos, after looking at the existing footage, insisted that the entire film needed to be reshot in 35mm film. Cardos directed the reshoot, which was entirely shot on an Arriflex 35 IIC. Richard Dix's son Robert Dix appears in the film as a Native American warrior. Isabel Sanford portrays the character Isabel Taylor. Janee Michelle and Robert DoQui share nude sex scenes in the film. Rafer Johnson, who had won medals as a decathlete at the Olympic Games, starred in the film and intended to use all the money he earned from acting in the film to start his own film company. The financial success of the film led to the production of several other films in the genre. When the film was released on home video, it was renamed Buffalo Soldier.

See also
 List of American films of 1972
 List of American films of 1970

References

Bibliography

1970 films
Blaxploitation films
American Western (genre) films
1970 Western (genre) films
Western (genre) cavalry films
Buffalo Soldiers
Films shot in Texas
Films directed by John Cardos
1970 directorial debut films
Films scored by Stu Phillips
1970s English-language films
1970s American films